Radio Silence is an album by Boris Grebenshchikov (simplified to "Grebenshikov" on the cover), leader of the Russian group Aquarium. The album was recorded in 1988 – 1989 in studios in the United States, United Kingdom, and Canada, mostly with Western musicians, and produced by David A. Stewart. It was hailed as the first contract of a Russian (then, Soviet) rock musician with a Western label.

Having by then achieved the status of the most prominent rock musician in Russia, Boris had just recently been permitted to travel abroad (thanks to Perestroika). On most tracks, only Alexander Titov (bass) is of the then-current Russian Aquarium band, the rest being Western musicians (with the exception of Death of King Arthur where many Aquarium musicians can be heard). It was originally planned that the album would have half songs in Russian and half in English, but in the final album there are only two Russian songs on the B side.

History
In 1987, American music producers Marina Albi and Kenny Shaffer noticed Grebenshchikov; they helped him to obtain a US visa and to sign a contract with CBS for recording eight albums. Radio Silence was the first one. It was recorded and presented in 1988 and distributed in 1989. The recording process was documented in the 1989 film The Long Way Home by Michael Apted.

Track listing
All songs were written by Grebenshchikov, except for "Death of King Arthur" and "China".

"Radio Silence"
"The Postcard"
"The Wind"
"The Time"
"Winter"
"That Voice Again"
"Молодые Львы (The Young Lions)"
"Fields of My Love"
"Death of King Arthur" (music by BG, lyrics by Sir Thomas Malory)
"Real Slow Today"
"Mother"
"Китай (China)"  (music by Alexander Vertinsky and lyrics by Nikolay Gumilyov)

Personnel
Boris Grebenshchikov – vocals, guitar
David A. Stewart – guitar
Olle Romo – drums, synclavier
Patrick Seymour – keyboards
Sasha Titov, Chucho Merchan  – bass
Michael Kamen – oboe
Darryl Way – violin
Ray Cooper – percussion
Dave Plews – trumpet
Annie Lennox, Siobhan Stewart, Billy MacKenzie, John Stewart, Harry Dean Stanton, Seva Gakkel, Charlie Wilson, Chrissie Hynde, Joniece Jamison – vocals

Charts

References

Boris Grebenshchikov albums
1989 albums
Albums produced by David A. Stewart
Columbia Records albums